Woman of the World (The Best of 2007–2018) is a compilation album by Scottish singer-songwriter Amy Macdonald. The album was released on 23 November 2018 by Mercury Records. Macdonald announced a European tour in support of the album, which took place between March and April 2019.

Background
The album includes all of her greatest hits including "Mr Rock & Roll" and "This Is the Life", plus two new songs, "Woman of the World" and "Come Home"; both songs are included in the film Patrick. Talking about the album, Macdonald said, "I remember the week of the 30th July 2007 – I released my first ever album This Is The Life, and I wasn’t quite sure how I found myself in that position. My album was number 1 in countries I’d never even been to before [...] 10 years later people were still interested. I just felt that after such an incredible journey it was time to look back and feel proud of everything that has happened."

Track listings

Charts

Release history

References

Amy Macdonald albums
Mercury Records albums
Albums produced by Richard Stannard (songwriter)
Albums produced by Ash Howes